Missing Man or missing man can mean:

 Missing Man, a superhero created by Steve Ditko
 Missing man formation, a flypast or similar salute to a fallen comrade